The Monteverdi Sierra is a Swiss luxury car produced by Monteverdi based on the underpinnings of the Dodge Aspen and Plymouth Volare. From 1977 to 1980, around 20 cars were built.

History 
The Monteverdi Sierra was a car built between 1977 and 1980 by the Swiss firm Monteverdi, the cars were essentially reskinned Dodge Aspens and Plymouth Volares, although the two convertible versions were based on Dodge Diplomat coupes. The coach work was done by the Italian coach building firm Carrozzeria Fissore, where they were given new front and rear end styling, custom Italian leather interiors, custom gauge clusters, and a custom console. The new styling included Fiat 125 headlight assemblies, Renault 12 taillights and Wolf Race mag wheels.

The suspension was changed from the Chrysler torsion bar design to an independent, upper wishbones and lower horizontal arms combined with trailing radius rods, coil springs, adjustable shock absorbers and stabilizer bar. The only powertrain option was a  Chrysler 318 cubic inch Small Block V8 paired to a Chrysler TorqueFlite A-904 3 speed automatic transmission.

Production 

Approximately 15 sedans
2 convertibles (1 red and 1 silver)
5 station wagons

See also 

Plymouth Volare
Dodge Aspen
Dodge Diplomat

References 

Monteverdi vehicles
Cars introduced in 1977
Sedans